Nikola Đurđić (Serbian Cyrillic: Никола Ђурђић; born 1 April 1986) is a Serbian professional footballer who plays as a striker or as an attacking midfielder for Degerfors IF in Allsvenskan.

Club career

Early years
Đurđić started out at his hometown club Radnički Pirot, making his senior debut in 2004. He subsequently moved to Voždovac in the summer of 2006. In his debut season with the Zmajevi, Đurđić was the club's top scorer with 10 league goals, as they suffered relegation from the top flight of Serbian football. He spent another year and a half at the club, before moving abroad in the 2009 winter transfer window.

Haugesund
In March 2009, Đurđić joined Norwegian side Haugesund on a three-year deal. He scored 10 league goals in his first season at the club, as they gained promotion to the Tippeligaen. In the following three seasons, Đurđić scored 36 league goals (12 each season). He scored a total of 57 goals during his tenure at Haugesund (including 11 cup goals).

Loan to Helsingborg
In August 2012, Đurđić was loaned to Swedish club Helsingborg. He joined them ahead of their 2012–13 UEFA Champions League qualifying tie against Celtic. The original contract was to last until 15 January 2013 and included an option to purchase if desired. As well as signing this loan contract, Đurđić also extended his contract with Haugesund lasting until the end of 2014.

Until the end of the 2012 season, Đurđić scored 10 league goals from 11 appearances for Helsingborg. He also netted four goals in Group L of the 2012–13 UEFA Europa League, as the club finished in third place. On 4 October 2012, Đurđić scored a brace in a 2–2 home draw with Twente. He subsequently scored his side's first goal in a 2–3 away loss against Hannover 96. On 6 December 2012, Đurđić netted the opener in his team's 3–1 away win over Twente.

SpVgg Greuther Fürth

On 1 January 2013, Đurđić officially moved to SpVgg Greuther Fürth on a three-and-a-half-year deal. He made his debut for the club on 26 January 2013, coming on as a substitute in a 0–3 home league loss to Mainz 05. On 2 February 2013, in his second Bundesliga game, Đurđić provided an assist to Felix Klaus and also scored an injury time winner away at Schalke 04. He netted a total of five league goals until the end of the 2012–13 season, as the club finished bottom of the table and suffered relegation to the 2. Bundesliga.

After scoring a goal in the team's opener of the 2013–14 campaign, Đurđić torn his ACL in the league's third round, causing him to miss the majority of the season. He made his return on 2 March 2014, coming on as a substitute in a 3–2 home league win over FSV Frankfurt.

Augsburg
On 3 July 2014, it was announced that Đurđić joined FC Augsburg on a three-year deal. He made his first official appearance for the club in 0–1 DFB-Pokal away loss to 1. FC Magdeburg on 17 August 2014. Six days later, Đurđić made his league debut for Augsburg in a 0–2 away loss against 1899 Hoffenheim. He scored his first goal for the club in a 2–1 away league win over 1. FC Köln on 6 December 2014.

Loan to Malmö FF

On 17 July 2015, Đurđić went on a six-month loan to Malmö FF. He made his debut for the club on 25 July 2015, scoring a 2nd-minute goal in a 3–0 home league win over Sundsvall. On 1 August 2015, Đurđić netted both of his team's goals in a 2–2 away league draw against Åtvidaberg. He then scored the opening goal of a 3–0 victory over Red Bull Salzburg in the second leg of the 2015–16 UEFA Champions League third qualifying round. The club eventually reached the group stage of the competition. On 15 September 2015, Đurđić made his UEFA Champions League debut, playing the full 90 minutes in a 2-0 away loss to Paris Saint-Germain at Parc des Princes. He also failed to convert a penalty in a 1–0 home win over Shakhtar Donetsk on 21 October 2015.

Loan to Fortuna Düsseldorf
On 1 February 2016, Đurđić was loaned to Fortuna Düsseldorf until the end of the 2015–16 season. He scored two goals from 12 appearances in the process, as the club avoided relegation from the 2. Bundesliga.

Partizan
On 21 June 2016, Đurđić was transferred to Serbian club Partizan. He signed a two-year deal and was given the number 40 shirt.

Randers
In January 2017, Đurđić moved to Danish club Randers. His debut at the club would be postponed due to an injury, that kept him sidelined for two months. Đurđić made his first competitive appearance in a 0–1 loss against Odense BK on 18 April.

Hammarby

2018
On 15 March 2018, Đurđić joined Hammarby IF, the third Swedish club in his career. He signed a one-year contract (with an option for two further) with the Allsvenskan side. Đurđić had a flying start to his stint at the club, scoring 6 goals in 10 games as Hammarby was placed first in the league mid-season. He subsequently signed a new three and half-year deal with the side on 2 July. Hammarby eventually fell of in the table, and finished 4th in the league, with Đurđić scoring 13 goals in 27 games.

2019
On 27 July 2019, he scored his first hat-trick with Hammarby in a 6–1 away win against AFC Eskilstuna. Hammarby finished 3rd in the table, as Đurđić scored 13 goals in 27 games and got voted as Allsvenskan forward of the year.

Chengdu
On 24 January 2020, Đurđić was sold to Chengdu Better City in the China League Two. The transfer fee was reportedly set at around 5 million Swedish kronor.

Degerfors IF
On 19 August 2021, Đurđić joined newly promoted Allsvenskan club Degerfors IF on a free transfer, signing a two and a half-year contract.

International career
On 15 May 2007, Đurđić made his debut for Serbia at under-21 level, coming on as a substitute in a 6–2 home friendly win over the Cyprus U21s. He was also a member of the team at the Valeriy Lobanovskyi Memorial Tournament in August of that year. On 8 September 2007, Đurđić scored his first goal for the Under-21 side in a 3–1 European Championship qualifier win over Belarus.

On 6 February 2013, Đurđić made his senior debut for Serbia under Siniša Mihajlović, playing the first half in a 3–1 away friendly win against Cyprus.

Career statistics

Club

International
Appearances and goals by national team and year

Honours
Haugesund
 Norwegian First Division: 2009
Individual
Eliteserien Forward of the Year: 2011
 Allsvenskan Forward of the Year: 2019

References

External links

Player profile on Serbian National Team page
 
 Altomfotball profile
 
 
 
 

1986 births
Living people
2. Bundesliga players
Allsvenskan players
Association football forwards
Bundesliga players
Danish Superliga players
Expatriate footballers in China
Expatriate men's footballers in Denmark
Expatriate footballers in Germany
Expatriate footballers in Norway
Expatriate footballers in Sweden
FC Augsburg players
FK Haugesund players
FK Partizan players
FK Radnički Pirot players
FK Voždovac players
Fortuna Düsseldorf players
Helsingborgs IF players
Malmö FF players
Hammarby Fotboll players
Degerfors IF players
Chengdu Better City F.C. players
China League One players
Norwegian First Division players
People from Pirot
Randers FC players
Serbia international footballers
Serbia under-21 international footballers
Serbian expatriate footballers
Serbian expatriate sportspeople in China
Serbian expatriate sportspeople in Denmark
Serbian expatriate sportspeople in Germany
Serbian expatriate sportspeople in Norway
Serbian expatriate sportspeople in Sweden
Serbian First League players
Serbian footballers
Serbian SuperLiga players
SpVgg Greuther Fürth players
Eliteserien players